General Salazar may refer to:

Amador Salazar (1868–1916), Mexican military leader who served as a general in the Mexican Revolution
José Inés Salazar (1884–1917), leading Orozquista General in the Mexican Revolution 
Julio Salazar (fl. 1990s–2000s), Peruvian Army general